The Wolseley Sheep Shearing Machine Company Limited was a London-incorporated public listed company created to capitalize on a sheep-shearing machinery business established by Frederick Wolseley in Australia which was managed by Herbert Austin who went on to manufacture Wolseley and Austin cars.

Frederick Wolseley's innovations to sheep shearing machinery revolutionised the entire wool industry.

The wool industry was much reduced by the advent of synthetic textiles. Wolseley Sheep Shearing Machine Company was obliged to diversify into heating equipment then building materials. Its name and business has continued, supplemented since 1982 by Ferguson Enterprises, a large American supplier of building materials.

A Jersey holding company was set up in 2017 named Ferguson plc and under that name and ownership the original Wolseley business remains listed on the London Stock Exchange and a constituent of the FTSE 100 Index. The British and Canadian operations are still called Wolseley. Ferguson plc's global headquarters is in Zug, Switzerland.

History

Origins

The English business was founded by Frederick York Wolseley in London in 1889 and a company was incorporated there with a capital of £200,000 to better realize the potential of his sheep shearing invention patented in March 1877. Herbert Austin, who had worked on the product's development in Melbourne Australia from 1887, was appointed its manager and received a share of its equity.

Wolseley, owner of a large sheep station, had set up a business of the same name in Sydney, Australia, in 1887. He manufactured the sheep shearing machinery largely by assembling bought-in components. Impressed by Austin, who managed one of the suppliers, Wolseley employed him at this business.

His first sheep shearing machinery was driven by horse power replaced later by stationary engines. Following wide demonstrations in eastern Australia and New Zealand in 1887–1888, a woolshed in Louth, N.S.W., was set up with the machinery and was the first to complete a shearing with the machines. Eighteen more woolsheds were equipped with Wolseley's invention in 1888. The Australian incorporation was wound up and the business's ownership transferred to the new London company in 1889 but operations were retained in Australia.

During the early 1890s Austin studied Wolseley's shearing machinery in use on a large sheep station and patented several improvements. By 1893, however, they were facing a crisis when it was discovered they had sold a large amount of defective machinery, brought about by the failure of local suppliers to meet the required specifications. Austin was sent to England to open a manufacturing operation there. In November 1893 Wolseley and Austin arrived in England, where Austin managed the business from a small workshop in Broad Street, Birmingham. Wolseley, with his Australian pastoral interests, resigned in 1894 because of poor health.

Wolseley Shearing Machine

Wool was clipped from the sheep's back by hand shears from time immemorial. Wolseley invented and developed the first satisfactory mechanical method using a power source away from the shearer's hand. The first power source was a horse gin connected by belt and pulley and a carefully designed driveshaft to a handpiece held by the shearer.

As well as relieving the shearer's hand of the cutting effort, the machine clips the wool at its full length, which often doubles or triples its value. It also removes the wool in a fleece instead of chopping it into small pieces like the shears.

Sir,—It may interest some of your readers to know how sheep are shorn by machines. Before writing about them, it will be as well to say something of hand shearing. Shearing on a sheep station is the one busy time of the year; and if there are from 30,000 to 50,000 sheep to get through, there will be 16 or 20 shearers. Amongst these there are sure to be some men who are what is termed rough—that is they do not take off the wool clean, make lots of second cuts, and cut the sheep badly. Even good shearers make second cuts in the wool when going over the back, in the flank and about the neck; and when wool is cut up in small pieces it must deteriorate the price. No one who has not seen it would believe the way some sheep are cut and gashed with the shears. Every shearer cuts more or less—most of them more; and your readers could judge of how sheep are shorn by the number some men get over in the day. Merino ewes are fine in the wool and very tender in the skin; yet most ordinary shearers do from 150 to even 200 a day. It is impossible to do such a number well. For the last five or six years managers have been more exacting; but the rule of the station always is, "Get the shearing through," so that the sheep may get quickly back to the hills. Shearing is the best paid and worst done work in the colony. Just now it is 15s per 100 sheep.

The shearing machines are worked on the principle of a horse clipper; there is a comb with slightly elevated teeth, made of steel, the knife works on the top of the comb; a three-horsepower engine will work 16 machines in the following manner:—There is a shaft running the whole length of the shearing floor, about 7 feet from the ground. At each shearer's stand there is a wheel(which turns the machinery) that is connected with the knife. This part is above the shearer's head, and a leather pipe, about an inch in diameter, incloses a piece of sheep gut, which gives the knife 1600 revolutions a minute. There is a universal joint in the handle of the machine, and any one can soon learn to use it. There is a handle at the wheel of each of the driving machines, by which the shearing machine is put in or out of gear. A shearer catches a sheep and brings it to his stand; he then pulls the handle and his machine is ready. With two or three cuts he has the brisket clean, he then runs the machine across the belly, cleans the hind legs and round the tail; then up the neck and round the head, finishes the neck, down shoulder and side, and over backbone, then down the other side, and stops the machine, and lets the sheep go. The machine runs through the wool quite easily. It is just guided to any part, and goes round the ears the same as down the side; you can shear either very close, or can leave wool on by altering the comb. They are made in several thicknesses; in cold parts it is a great advantage to leave a little wool on the sheep. A careful man with the machine will never cut a sheep. The only way they are cut is from a broken comb, or when shearing, letting the skin get in a wrinkle, which sometimes gets through the teeth of the comb, but the cut is only the top skin. Then the wool is splendidly taken off; there is not a break in the fleece all over. Even thin-woolled old ewes—which the best hand-shearer could not shear without breaking the fleece across the back—are done just the same as heavy woolled sheep.

When the fleeces are thrown out to the table to be skirted, they do not take nearly so much room as hand-shorn ones. A hand-shearer has always to be pulling the fleece out of his way, but with the machines it just falls over as it is cut. I think that for anyone connected with sheep, the machines are the most wonderful thing ever invented. This is the first year they have been in New Zealand, but I believe in short time they will be universal. I saw them at work at Messrs James Smith and Sons of Greenfield, and they most kindly showed me everything about them. They have 14 machines, and when I was there had been using them about 10 days, and the shearers were doing on an average over 100 per man. One man did 160, and when you consider the superior way the sheep are shorn, and, you get every ounce of wool taken off as it grows on the sheep, I should think that the expense of getting the machines fitted up would repay itself in two years by the extra price of the wool and the far less knocking about the sheep get. The only part of the machines that seems to get out of order is the gut connection. If the pipe gets bent or twisted by careless men, the friction is so great that the gut is burnt through; but this never happens if it is kept straight, and I have heard that they are to have a connection made of steel ribbon twisted and jointed, but even at present they are near perfection.

Lea Flat Station, Outram, Otago.

–Otago Witness, Issue 1892, 15 May 1890, Page 9

Diversification

Wolseley cars

Seeking other suitable products Austin designed his first car in 1896 and for the next four years continued to develop and improve his designs. Though the board did allow Austin to purchase some machinery to build cars they decided around 1900, it was unlikely to be a profitable industry. In 1901, Wolseley's embryo car business was acquired by Vickers, Sons and Maxim.

Wolseley-Hughes

In 1958 the business was merged with that of Geo H. Hughes, a Birmingham-based manufacturer of wheels for prams and later wheels for industrial use, and was renamed Wolseley-Hughes in 1986.

Prospectus: The Wolseley Sheep Shearing Machine Company Limited of London
London, 12 October 1889

Capital —£200,000 in 40,000 shares of £5 each; 13,332 fully paid deferred shares will be allotted to the vendors leaving 26,668 shares of £5 each which are now offered for subscription.

The vendors (The Wolseley Sheep Shearing Machine Company Limited of Sydney) who are the promoters of this company have fixed the price to be paid for all the patent rights and trade mark obtained and applied for at £75,000 cash and 13,332 fully paid deferred shares of the company.

Directors
James Alexander, (Redfern, Alexander & Co) director of the Bank of Australasia
F H Dangar, director of Commercial Banking Co of Sydney (London board)
John Muirhead, (Latimer Clark Muirhead & Co Limited)
Abraham Scott, (chairman of Goldsbrough Mort & Co Limited) (London board)
F Y Wolseley, Managing director

Secretary and offices —Hugh E Mcleod, Crown Court, Old Broad Street, London

Agents
Victoria NSW and Queensland —Goldsbrough Mort
South Australia —Hon. Henry Scott MLC
New Zealand, Tasmania and S, Africa —Redfern Alexander & Co
South America – O.G. Oliver-Jones

The company is formed for the purpose of acquiring and working the patent rights in Great Britain . . . and other countries for the Sheep-Shearing Machine and accessories invented and patented by Mr Frederic (sic) York Wolseley

It is estimated that the number of sheep in the countries for which patents have been obtained and applied for amounts to 400,000,000. This forms a magnificent field for operations . . .

National Museum of Australia
There is a Wolseley brand two-stand portable shearing plant in the collection of the National Museum of Australia in Canberra. Manufactured in Birmingham, England, around 1930, the shearing plant is powered by a three horse-power single-cylinder petrol engine, mounted on a wooden trolley base with four cast iron wheels. The plant incorporated a revolutionary mechanised shearing handpiece, one of which is also in the museum's collection. The engine is painted green and inscribed with the brand name Wolseley, and has a metal manufacturer's plate which reads: Wolseley Sheep Shearing Machine Company Ltd Birmingham England. The plant, weighing 550 kg, was used on a sheep property named 'Emoh Ruo' in the Rockley-Black Springs area of New South Wales. It was used by Roy and George Keogh between 1948 and 1976.

See also
 Frederick Wolseley
 Wolseley Motors

References

External links
Illustrations
 Handpiece
 Cutter
 Comb
 The machinery in use (video)
 some Wolseley stationary engines

Manufacturing companies established in 1889
1889 establishments in England
1958 mergers and acquisitions
Agricultural machinery manufacturers of the United Kingdom
Sheep shearing